The King County Sheriff's Office (KCSO) is a local police agency in King County, Washington, United States. It is the primary law enforcement agency for all unincorporated areas of King County, as well as 12 cities and two transit agencies which contract their police services to the KCSO. KCSO also provides police and fire Aircraft Rescue and Fire Fighting to the King County International Airport (Boeing Field). KCSO also provides regional-level support services to other local law enforcement agencies such as air support and search and rescue. The department has over 1,000 employees and serves 2.1 million citizens, over 500,000 of whom live in either unincorporated areas or the 12 contract cities.

The current Sheriff of King County is Patti Cole-Tindall, the former Undersheriff within the department. Cole-Tindall was appointed in November 2021 and was sworn in on January 1, 2022 then confirmed as permanent sheriff by the King County Council on May 23, 2022

History

The first King County Sheriff was elected in 1852. The office was renamed the King County Department of Public Safety after voters approved a charter change in 1968, and the director would be appointed. In the 1980s, the name of the department was again changed, this time to the King County Police Department. In 1996, voters decided to reinstate voting for the sheriff and the name was changed back to the King County Sheriff’s Office. However, in 2020, voters decided to return to an appointed sheriff and to allow the King County Council to change the duties of the sheriff.

As a result of the 2020 election, on December 31, 2021, Sheriff Mitzi Johanknecht finished out her elected term. Johanknecht's Undersheriff, Patti Cole-Tindall was appointed as Interim Sheriff by Executive Dow Constantine.

Sheriffs since 1981

 Barney Winckoski, 1981-1983 
 Jim Nickle (acting sheriff), 1983 
 Vernon Thomas, 1983-1987 
 Jim Nickle (acting sheriff), 1987-1988 
 James Montgomery, 1988-1997
 Dave Reichert, 1997-2004
 Sue Rahr, 2005-2012
 Steve Strachan, 2012 
 John Urquhart, 2012-2018
 Mitzi Johanknecht, 2018-2021
 Patti Cole-Tindall, current

Divisions
 Office of the Sheriff - includes the Sheriff, Undersheriff, chief of staff, aides, a media relations officer, labor negotiator, the Internal Investigations Unit, and the Legal Unit.
 Field Operations Division - manages the core functions of patrol, precinct-based detectives, crime prevention, storefronts, and reserve deputies. The subdivision into four precincts allows for better community-based responses because the precinct commanders can use local data to direct law enforcement services. Day-to-day management of contract city police and school resource officers, are the responsibility of this division.
 Special Operations Division - provides support services to other divisions, regional services to local agencies, and contract police service to the King County Metro Transit Division (including Sound Transit Police), King County Department of Transportation (Motor Unit (disbanded 10/1/12)), and the King County International Airport ARFF Police. Services provided by this division include: a K-9 unit with search and drug detection capabilities; Air Support (Guardian One); Marine Unit; Bomb Squad; tactical training in firearms, less-lethal weapons, and defensive tactics; Tac-30 (SWAT); hostage negotiations; dignitary protection; tow coordination and appeal hearings; Search & Rescue; D.M.T. (Demonstration Management Team); instruction in and equipment for Haz-Mat; and special event planning and coordination. The division has also taken the lead in planning for homeland security concerns.
 Criminal Investigations Division (CID) - includes the Major Crimes Section, the Special Investigations Section, and the King County Regional Criminal Intelligence Group. The division serves citizens with follow-up investigative, warrant, and intelligence-gathering services. Specifically, it investigates crimes including homicide, domestic violence, computer fraud, forgery, sexual assault, and more. CID also addresses child support enforcement issues.
 Technical Services Division - provides the bulk of support services that are vital to efficient operations. Often, the employees in this division provide direct services to citizens as well as support services to the other divisions. Services provided by the division personnel include emergency 9-1-1 call receiving and dispatching, managing court security (County Marshals), technology development, records, contracting, civil process, personnel/hiring, payroll, purchasing, training, photography, application and administration of grants, planning, and all aspects of fingerprint identification.

Contract cities

The following cities contract their police departments to KCSO:

 Beaux Arts Village
 Burien
 Carnation
 Covington
 Kenmore
 Maple Valley
 Newcastle
 Sammamish
 SeaTac
 Shoreline
 Skykomish
 Woodinville

Other contracts

 King County International Airport Police/Fire ARFF (Boeing Field)
 King County Dept. of Transportation: Roads Division 
 Muckleshoot Indian Tribe
 Metro Transit Police 
 Sound Transit Police
 King County Marshals
 King County Fire/Arson Investigators 
 c. 15 additional contract services from school districts to security
 Marine Patrol contract to the cities of Beaux Arts, Bellevue, Issaquah, Kenmore, Kirkland, Redmond, Sammamish, and Yarrow Point. Marine calls for service only on all other King County Sheriff's Office city patrol contracts.

Most of the contracts within the Sheriff's Office have their own patch and patrol car design and wear a King County Sheriff badge, while other contracts have no identity other than the King County Sheriff uniform, patch and patrol car.  Those contracts that don't have their own identity are Beaux Arts Village, Skykomish, Muckleshoot Tribe (they wear a tribal patch on each sleeve beneath the King County Sheriff patch) and King County Metro Transit.  King County Metro Transit Police, a unit of the sheriff's office, do have their own style of patrol car specific to Metro Police, and their own uniform with the standard King County Sheriff patch.  The city of North Bend contracted with the KCSO from 1973 until March 8, 2014 when the City of Snoqualmie Police Department took over the policing duties in North Bend, at that time the North Bend contract was KCSO longest standing contract.

The KCSO Motor Unit existed under contract with the King County Department of Transportation: Roads Division, which in turn provided funding for S.T.E.P (the Selective Traffic Enforcement Program) which targeted select arterials within unincorporated King County based on a history of accidents, chronic traffic problems, and high citizen complaints.  The KCSO Motors Unit wore the standard KCSO patch and Class A uniform and rode Honda KCSO marked police motorcycles.  The Motor Unit participated in traffic enforcement, instructor certifications, dignitary protection and escort, parades and special events, educational and school activities as well as extensive motorcycle training.  This unit was disbanded October 1, 2012. The contract cities of Sammamish and SeaTac each have two full time motorcycle deputies assigned to traffic patrol duties.

Rank structure

Contract city chiefs wear three stars when in their contract uniform and one star when in a KCSO uniform.

Law Enforcement Exploring Program
The King County Sheriff's Office has a volunteer program for individuals between the ages of 14 and 21 who are interested in investigating a career in the field of law enforcement. The program is called the King County Sheriff Explorers and is a local post of the Learning for Life Exploring program. The explorer post has a rank structure similar to the Sheriff's Office. The explorers attend academies and competitions, ride-along with deputies on patrol, and receive training on a variety of law enforcement topics.

There are four Explorer posts in cities contracted with the King County Sheriff's Office, those being an unincorporated post in Woodinville, as well as city posts in Maple Valley, Burien, and Sammamish.

Controversy

In February 2012, Dustin Theoharis was shot sixteen times by a sheriff's deputy and a Department of Corrections officer as he lay in his bed. The officers were attempting to search the home for another man when they saw Theoharis move and they opened fire. Officers responding to the shooting allegedly failed to gather evidence, moved items at the crime scene and acted as advocates for the shooters. An internal investigation found no wrongdoing on the part of the officers. The officers involved refused to cooperate with the investigation. The state settled a lawsuit for $2.5 Million. The county agreed to pay $3 million to settle the matter. Sheriff John Urquhart pointed out to the press that he was not responsible for this incident as he had not yet been elected.

In 2017 Detective Richard Rowe in plain clothes approached a motorcyclist from behind with his gun drawn without identifying himself as a law enforcement officer for a full minute. He also reached into the motocyclist's pocket to pull out his wallet so that an observer might think an armed robbery was in progress.  The department later settled the case with a $65,000 payment to the victim and agreed to modify its use-of-force policy.

In March 2021, the King County Sheriff's Office agreed to pay out a $5 million settlement to the family of Tommy Le, a 20-year-old high school student who was shot and killed by Deputy Cesar Molina in 2017. Deputies had encountered Le while responding to a report of a disoriented man who may have been armed with a knife or sharp object. The sheriff's office initially stated that Le attacked deputies with a knife or other sharp object and that Molina shot Le in self-defense. An investigation by the sheriff's office Use of Force Board cleared the shooting on the basis that deputies "reasonably believed that [Le] was armed with a deadly weapon and had already attacked someone with a knife". However, a subsequent outside review of the case found a "lack of rigor" in the sheriff's office's investigation, pointing to significant issues such as evidence suggesting that Le was likely moving away from the deputies when he was shot. The review also found that while Le was found to be carrying a ballpoint pen during the encounter, KCSO investigators spent a large amount of their time trying to find the knife reported by one witness in order to justify the shooting.

See also
 List of law enforcement agencies in Washington (state)

References

External links

 King County Sheriff website
 
 King County Sheriff Explorer website

Sheriffs' offices of Washington (state)
Sheriff